Park Seon-Kwan (also Park Seon-Gwan, ; born January 16, 1991, in Gyeonggi-do) is a South Korean swimmer, who specialized in backstroke events. He won a bronze medal, as a member of the South Korean swimming team, in the 400 m freestyle relay at the 2010 Asian Games in Guangzhou, China. He also collected two silver medals in the 100 and 200 m backstroke at the 2009 East Asian Games in Hong Kong, China. Park is a member of the swimming team at Korea National Sports University in Seoul.

Park qualified for the men's 100 m backstroke at the 2012 Summer Olympics in London, by clearing a FINA B-standard entry time of 55.39 at the FINA World Championships in Shanghai, China. He challenged seven other swimmers in the second heat, including Olympic veterans Omar Pinzón of Colombia and former bronze medalist George Bovell of Trinidad and Tobago. Park edged out Russian-born swimmer Alexandr Tarabrin of Kazakhstan to take a fifth spot by four hundredths of a second (0.04), with a time of 55.51 seconds. Park failed to advance into the semifinals, as he placed thirty-sixth overall in the preliminary heats.

References

External links
NBC Olympics Profile

1991 births
Living people
Sportspeople from Gyeonggi Province
South Korean male backstroke swimmers
South Korean male freestyle swimmers
Swimmers at the 2012 Summer Olympics
Olympic swimmers of South Korea
Swimmers at the 2010 Asian Games
Swimmers at the 2014 Asian Games
Swimmers at the 2018 Asian Games
Asian Games silver medalists for South Korea
Asian Games bronze medalists for South Korea
Medalists at the 2010 Asian Games
Asian Games medalists in swimming
21st-century South Korean people